Jalisco State Highway 225 (JAL 225) is a  east–west state highway route between the towns of Yahualica de González Gallo and Huisquilco, Jalisco, Mexico.

References

Transportation in Jalisco
Jalisco 225
1990s establishments in Mexico